The Best American Poetry 2008, a volume in The Best American Poetry series, was edited by poet Charles Wright, guest editor, who made the final selections, and David Lehman, the general editor for the series.

This book is the 21st volume in the most popular annual poetry anthology in the United States.

See also
 2008 in poetry

Notes

External links
  Web page for the book

Best American Poetry series
2008 poetry books
Poetry
American poetry anthologies